Persatuan Sepakbola Indonesia Salatiga (simply known as PSISa Salatiga) is an Indonesian football club based in Salatiga, Central Java. They currently compete in the Liga 3.

References

External links
 

Football clubs in Indonesia
Football clubs in Central Java
Association football clubs established in 1934
1934 establishments in the Dutch East Indies